Mujuzi Pius (died 11 June 2021) was a Ugandan politician.

Biography 
Pius was a Member of the Parliament of Uganda from 2001 to 2011. He died from COVID-19 at his home in Kampala at age 61.

References 

1950s births
1960s births
2021 deaths
Members of the Parliament of Uganda
Deaths from the COVID-19 pandemic in Uganda